Luebo is a territory of Kasai province of the Democratic Republic of the Congo.

Territories of Kasaï Province